Bauern Echo was one of the newspapers which was published in East Germany. It was the official organ of the Democratic Farmers' Party of Germany and was in circulation between 1948 and 1990. Its subtitle was Organ der Demokratischen Bauernpartei Deutschlands (German: Organ of the Democratic Farmers' Party of Germany).

History and profile
Bauern Echo was first published on 18 July 1948. It was owned the Democratic Farmers' Party of Germany. The paper was published by the Deutscher Bauernverlag in Berlin. Its target audience was East German farmers. The paper frequently emphasized the common interests of the farmers and industrial workers in the country. In January 1954 Bauern Echo published an article concerning the visit of an Iranian communist exile, Bozorg Alavi, to Aschersleben where he met with the farmers. 

The frequency of Bauern Echo was weekly from its start to 1962 when it became daily. As of 1959 it had eleven district editions. In the early 1970s its circulation was 150,000 copies. The paper ceased publication on 31 July 1990 with the issue 176.

References

External links

1948 establishments in Germany
1990 establishments in East Germany
Communist newspapers
Daily newspapers published in Germany
Defunct newspapers published in Germany
Former state media
German-language communist newspapers
Mass media in East Germany
Publications established in 1948
Newspapers published in Berlin
Political newspapers
Publications disestablished in 1990
Weekly newspapers published in Germany